Shlomo Goldman (April 1, 1947 – July 21, 2017), also known as the Sanz Zviller rebbe, was the Grand Rabbi of the Sanz-Klausenberger community in Union City, New Jersey, where he resided.

Goldman was the son of the previous Zviller Rebbe, Rabbi Mordchai Goldman, and a son-in-law of the late Sanz-Klausenburger Rebbe, Rabbi Yekusiel Yehudah Halberstam. Born in Jerusalem, he was designated to head the new hasidic community that was being established in Union City.

Goldman died Friday morning, July 21, 2017.

References

See also
Klausenberg (Hasidic dynasty)
Sanz (Hasidic dynasty)
Zvhil (Hasidic dynasty)

Sanz (Hasidic dynasty)
Hasidic rebbes
American Hasidic rabbis
1947 births
2017 deaths
Burials at the Jewish cemetery on the Mount of Olives
Rabbis from New Jersey
People from Union City, New Jersey
Rebbes of Sanz-Klausenberg